Pruthviswara II was a Telugu king of Velanati Chodas who ruled from 1186 to 1207 AD.

He was the last important ruler of the kingdom and he stayed at Pithapuram.  He made several vain attempts to win the lost prestige.  When Kakatiyas were fighting Yadavas, he seized the opportunity and reoccupied Verlanadu including places like Chandolu and Vengi.  However he lost to Kakatiyas and Nellore Chodas starting from 1201 to 1207 AD.

References 
 Durga Prasad, History of the Andhras up to 1565 A. D., P. G. PUBLISHERS, GUNTUR (1988)
 South Indian Inscriptions - http://www.whatisindia.com/inscriptions/

Velanati Chodas
12th-century Indian monarchs
13th-century Indian monarchs